St. Fintan's Hospital GAA was a Gaelic Athletic Association gaelic football club in County Laois, Ireland.

The club was founded in the late 1940s by staff members at St. Fintan's Hospital in Portlaoise.

The Laois Intermediate Football Championship was won on three occasions (1951, 1960 and 1970) and the Laois Junior Football Championships was also won on three occasions (1950, 1959 and 1964).

The club faded out of existence in the late 1970s after winning the Laois Junior B Football Championship in 1975.

References

Former Gaelic Athletic Association clubs in County Laois
Portlaoise